Mandarino is a surname of Italian origin. Notable people with the surname include:

Denis Mandarino (born 1964), Brazilian composer, artist and writer
José Edison Mandarino (born 1941), Brazilian tennis player
Mike Mandarino (1921–1985), American football player

References

Surnames of Italian origin